was a noted Japanese information theorist who made significant contributions to error correcting codes.  He was the earliest to publish the key ideas for the CYK algorithm, separately discovered by Daniel Younger (1967) and John Cocke (1970).

Kasami was born in Kobe, Japan, and  studied electrical engineering at Osaka University, where he received his B.E. degree in 1958, M.E. in 1960, and Ph.D. in 1963. He then joined the faculty, teaching until 1994, and was dean 1990–1992. He was subsequently professor in the Graduate School of Information Science at the Nara Institute of Science and Technology 1992–1998, and professor of information science at Hiroshima City University 1998–2004.

Kasami was an IEEE Fellow, and received the 1987 Achievement Award from the Institute of Electronics, Information, and Communications Engineers of Japan and the 1999 IEEE Claude E. Shannon Award.

See also
CYK algorithm
Kasami code

References

1930 births
2007 deaths
Fellow Members of the IEEE
Japanese computer scientists
Japanese information theorists
Osaka University alumni
People from Kobe
Academic staff of Nara Institute of Science and Technology